The men's javelin throw at the 2014 European Athletics Championships took place at the Letzigrund on 14 and 17 August.

Medalists

Results

Qualification
81.00 (Q) or at least 12 best performers (q) advanced to the Final.

Final

References

Javelin Throw
Javelin throw at the European Athletics Championships